Last year's champion Paul Capdeville was not defending his title.

Rogério Dutra da Silva won the title, defeating Blaž Rola in the final, 6–4, 6–2.

Seeds

  Blaž Rola (final)
  Guido Pella (quarterfinals)
  Horacio Zeballos (quarterfinals)
  Diego Sebastian Schwartzman (second round)
  João Souza (quarterfinals)
  Rogério Dutra da Silva (champion)
  Máximo González (quarterfinals)
  Gastão Elias (semifinals)

Draw

Finals

Top half

Bottom half

External links
 Main Draw
 Qualifying Draw

Sao Paulo Challenger de Tenis
Tennis tournaments in Brazil